Devrukhe Brahmins are one of five sub-castes of Maharashtrian Brahmins. This community is small in numbers compared to other Maharashtrian Brahmins such as Deshastha Brahmin, Konkanastha Brahmin and Karhade Brahmin.

Introduction
The Devrukhe brahmins are also called "Devarshi Brahmins". In 1926, the "Devrukhe Brahman Samiti", Bombay published a 16 page pamphlet in Marathi giving information about their community.

Origins

Tracing the origins of Devrukhe Brahmins, it leads to one of the oldest Marathi speaking Brahmins in Maharashtra - Deshastha Brahmin, residents of Desha i.e. over the Western Ghats. During the end of 15th century - a period marked by famine and turmoils of Mughal rule, many Brahmin families descended the Western Ghats and settled near Sangameshwar - Devrukh, Ratnagiri. Later they were called as Devrukhe Brahmins. They follow the same traditions as of other Maharashtrian brahmins along with the influences that may have resulted due to migration near Ratnagiri.

See also
 Hinduism
 Indian caste system

References

Brahmin communities of Maharashtra
Vegetarian communities